Elections were held in the Muskoka District Municipality of Ontario on October 24, 2022 in conjunction with municipal elections across the province.

Muskoka District Council
The Muskoka District Council, is made up of a 23 member council which includes the mayors of its six municipalities, three councillors each from Bracebridge, Gravenhurst, Huntsville and Muskoka Lakes, two each from Lake of Bays and Georgian Bay, plus a District Chair which is elected by council following the election.

Bracebridge
The following were the results for mayor and district council in Bracebridge.

Mayor

District Councillors
Three to be elected.

Georgian Bay
The following were the results for mayor and district council in Georgian Bay.

Mayor

District Councillors

Gravenhurst
The following were the results for mayor and district council in Gravenhurst.

Mayor
Incumbent mayor Paul Kelly did not run for re-election. Deputy mayor Heidi Lorenz ran against town councillor Terry Pilger, and Marc Mantha.

District Councillors
Three to be elected.

Huntsville
The following were the results for mayor and district council in Huntsville.

Mayor
Mayor Karin Terziano did not run for re-election. Running to replace her were Deputy Mayor Nancy Alcock, district councillor Tim Withey and former fire chief Stephen Hernen. Terziano was acclaimed to the position in 2019 when previous mayor Scott Atchison was elected to Parliament.

District Councillors
Three to be elected.

Lake of Bays
The following were the results for mayor and district council in Lake of Bays.

Mayor
Incumbent mayor Terry Glover was challenged by former Port Hope mayor Linda Thompson.

District Councillors

Muskoka Lakes
The following were the results for mayor and district council in Muskoka Lakes.

Mayor

District Councillors

References 

Muskoka
District Municipality of Muskoka